Protein unc-84 homolog A is a protein that in humans is encoded by the UNC84A gene.

This gene is a member of the unc-84 homolog family and encodes a nuclear nuclear envelope protein with an Unc84 (SUN) domain. The protein is involved in nuclear anchorage and migration. Several alternatively spliced transcript variants of this gene have been described; however, the full-length nature of some of these variants has not been determined.

References

Further reading